The Chinese Professional Baseball League (CPBL) recognizes strikeout champions in the each season. Champions have been awarded from 1994.

Champions

External links

Chinese Professional Baseball League lists
Chinese Professional Baseball League awards